3NE is an Australian Classic hits-formatted AM radio station, broadcasting from Wangaratta, Victoria to the surrounding areas of North East Victoria. 3NE was Opened on 27 March 1954. As of 1 November 2017 the station is owned and operated by Ace Radio, which acquired it and sister station Edge FM 102.1 from North East Broadcasters.

On-Air Schedule

Weekdays 
 12:00am–5:30am - Australia Overnight 
 5:30am–6:00am -  Country Today
 6:00am–8:30am -  Kylie King and Kev Poulton
 8:30am–12:00pm - Neil Mitchell
 12:00pm–1:00pm - Country Today
 1:00pm–5:00pm -  Matt Hobbs
 5:00pm-6:00pm -  Christian O'Connell Show
 6:00pm–8:00pm -  Sports Day
 8:00pm–12:00am-  Nights with Denis Walter

Saturdays 
 12:00am–6:00am - Australia Overnight
 6:00am–7:00am -  Reel Adventures
 7:00am–8:00am -  Gerard Whately
 8:00am-9:00am -  Only The Hits You Love
 9:00am–12:00pm - Off The Bench
 12:00pm-6:00pm - Only The Hits You Love 
 6:00pm-12:00am - Saturday Night Songfest

Sundays 
 12:00am–5:00am - Saturday Night Songfest
 5:00am-6:00am  - Driver's Seat
 6:00am–9:00am -  Sunday Country
 9:00am–10:00am - Only the hits you love
 10:00am-12:00pm -Classic Hits Countdown
 12:00pm-9:00pm - Only the hits you love
 9:00pm-10:00pm - Money Week
 10:00pm-11:00pm -This Is Your Journey
 11:00pm-12:00pm -Great Australian Lives

News
Cheandre Llewelynn

References

Radio stations in Victoria
Radio stations established in 1954
Classic hits radio stations in Australia
Ace Radio